Richard Lewis Johnson (December 18, 1946 – June 15, 1994) was an American professional basketball player.

A 6'9" center from Grambling State University, Johnson played parts of three seasons (1968–1971) with the Boston Celtics of the National Basketball Association. He averaged 4.7 points per game in his NBA career and won an NBA Championship ring in 1969.

Johnson later played for several American Basketball Association teams.

References

External links
Rich Johnson NBA Statistics at Basketball-Reference.com

1946 births
1994 deaths
American men's basketball players
Basketball players from Louisiana
Boston Celtics draft picks
Boston Celtics players
Carolina Cougars players
Centers (basketball)
Grambling State Tigers men's basketball players
Miami Floridians players
Pittsburgh Condors players
Sportspeople from Alexandria, Louisiana
Wilkes-Barre Barons players